Beau Weaver (born January 19, 1952) is an American voice actor in television and film, heard widely in trailers for feature films, network television promos, documentaries, national radio and television commercials and cartoons.

Career

Weaver was born and raised in Tulsa, Oklahoma. He became a disc jockey at age 15 and is sometimes known as Beauregard Rodriquez Weaver.

In the 1970s and 1980s, he was on the air at some of America's top pop music stations, such as KHJ in Los Angeles, KFRC in San Francisco, KILT in Houston, KCBQ in San Diego, KNUS in Dallas, and KAKC in Tulsa.  He was also one of the pioneers of satellite broadcasting as an original member of the air staff of the Transtar Radio Network.

By the 1980s, Weaver had left radio and began working as a freelance voice actor in Los Angeles. He was the announcer on the short-lived game show College Mad House, a spin-off of the kids' game show Fun House. Today, he is the voice of the CBS Domestic Television programs, The Insider and The Doctors.  He is the narrator on Animal Planet's doc series, Weird, True and Freaky, National Geographic's "Known Universe" and "American Loggers and "Heartland Thunder" on the Discovery Channel. Some recent movie trailers and television campaigns voiced by Weaver include: "Into The Wild" and "Revolutionary Road."

Weaver has done work with Disney, promoting their video releases in the late 1990s working alongside fellow Disney voice-overs Mark Elliott and Brian Cummings. One of his most notable Disney voice-overs is "Thanks for joining us for this special preview. And now, our Feature Presentation."

In television animation, Beau's most memorable roles include Superman/Clark Kent in the 1989 Ruby-Spears production of Superman, a revival of the series timed to coincide with the fiftieth anniversary of the creation of the character. In 1996, he played the lead role of Reed Richards a.k.a. "Mister Fantastic" in Marvel's Fantastic Four. Weaver was also the announcer of the first ever video newsmagazine, Real TV from 1996–1999 and again from 2000-2001.

Filmography

Animation roles
 Bonkers - Jingle
 Duckman - God
 Fantastic Four - Mister Fantastic, Trapster
 Future-Worm - Movie Narrator (Episode "Lobster Boy Movie Trailer")
 Superman - Superman
 Teenage Mutant Ninja Turtles - Additional Voices
 The Flintstone Kids - Additional Voices
 The Incredible Hulk - Mister Fantastic
 Mighty Mouse: The New Adventures - Fractured Narrator, Additional Voices
 The Transformers - Octane
 Visionaries: Knights of the Magical Light - Feryl

Live-action roles
 The Weird Al Show - Channel Hopping Announcer
 Most Daring - Narrator (Episodes 1-5)

Movie roles
 Little Nemo: Adventures in Slumberland - 1st Teacher
 Rockin' with Judy Jetson - Ramm, Dee-Jay
 The Substitute - Janus Showreel Narrator

Video game roles
 Marvel: Ultimate Alliance - Scorpion, Tiger Shark, Starbolt
 Fallout: New Vegas (Old World Blues DLC) - Dr. Borous, Book Chute

References

External links
 
 

1952 births
Living people
American male voice actors
Radio and television announcers
American male film actors
Male actors from Tulsa, Oklahoma